Jalan Pangkalan Ikan Cendering, Federal Route 459, is an institutional facilities federal road in Kuala Terengganu, Terengganu, Malaysia.

At most sections, the Federal Route 459 was built under the JKR R5 road standard, with a speed limit of 90 km/h.

List of junctions

References

Kuala Terengganu
Malaysian Federal Roads